Alaigne is a commune in the Aude department in the Occitanie region of southern France.

The inhabitants of the commune are known as Alaignois or Alaignoises

Geography
The commune is located some 10 km north-west of Limoux and 20 km east of Mirepoix.  A number of district roads all converge on the village of Alaigne: the D102 south from Belvèze-du-Razès, the D702 west from Routier, the D102 north-west from Limoux, and the D52 which comes east from Bellegarde-du-Razès then continues south to Villelongue-d'Aude.

The village itself is a traditional Circulade located in the historical region of Razès.

Located in the AOP Malepere wine growing area, the commune is mostly vineyards and farmland for wheat, rape and sunflowers with a few scattered forests.  There are no villages or hamlets other than Alaigne.

Neighbouring communes and towns

Heraldry

History
Before the Revolution, Alaigne was a part of Pieusse and Routier was a barony of the Archbishop of Narbonne.

Administration

List of Successive Mayors of Alaigne

Population

Culture and heritage

Civil heritage
The Porte de Papi Fortified door (15th century) is registered as an historical monument.

Religious heritage
The Cemetery contains a number of items that are registered as historical objects:
A Funeral Stèle (1668)
A Funeral Stèle (16th century)
A Funeral Stèle (17th century)
2 Funeral Stèles (16th century)
The Parish Church of Saint-Pierre es Liens contains a number of items that are registered as historical objects:
A Chalice with Paten (18th century)
A Chalice with Paten (1798 & 1809)
2 Stoups (18th century)
The facing of the Altar and the communion table (18th century)
A Reliquary Cross of Saint Julie (17th century)

See also
 Communes of the Aude department

References

External links
Alaigne on the National Geographic Institute website
Alaigne on Géoportail, National Geographic Institute (IGN) website 
Alaigne on the 1750 Cassini Map

Communes of Aude